Richard Reynolds Rowe (1824–1899) was an English architect.

The son of Richard Rowe, a Cambridge alderman, Richard Reynolds Rowe built several buildings around Cambridge, most notably the Cambridge Corn Exchange.

References

External links
 

1824 births
1899 deaths
People from Cambridge
Fellows of the Society of Antiquaries of London
Fellows of the Royal Institute of British Architects
19th-century English architects
Architects from Cambridgeshire